Sophie Løhde Jacobsen (born 11 September 1983) is a Danish politician, who is a member of the Folketing for the Venstre political party. She has been a member of parliament since the 2007 Danish general election, and served as Minister of Health from 2015 to 2016, and Minister of Public Innovation from 2016 to 2019.

Background
On 11 September 1983 Løhde was born in Birkerød, Denmark. Løhde's father is Ole A. Jacobsen. Løhde's mother is Karin Løhde, an art dealer and former mayor. In 2007, Løhde earned a BSc degree in business economics and company communications from Copenhagen Business School.

Career 
Løhde was a member of Rudersdal Municipality from 2006 to 2007.Løhde was elected member of Folketinget for Venstre in 2007. She served as Minister for Health and Elderly Affairs in the Lars Løkke Rasmussen II Cabinet from 2015 to 2016. In 2016, Løhde became a Minister for Public Innovation in the Lars Løkke Rasmussen III Cabinet until 2019.

References

External links 

 Biography on the website of the Danish Parliament (Folketinget)

|-

|-

1983 births
Living people
People from Rudersdal Municipality
Women government ministers of Denmark
Government ministers of Denmark
Danish Health Ministers
Danish municipal councillors
Venstre (Denmark) politicians
21st-century Danish women politicians
Women members of the Folketing
Members of the Folketing 2007–2011
Members of the Folketing 2011–2015
Members of the Folketing 2015–2019
Members of the Folketing 2019–2022
Members of the Folketing 2022–2026